DJ Concept is DJ and music producer from Long Island, New York. He is the co-founder of The Bash Brothers DJ Crew along with DJ Mickey Knox.

Biography
Between 2001 & 2007, Concept linked up with producer/mc Undefined to form the group Crisis Center. They put out 2 records: Volume 1 & Version 2.0 & won a best rap duo award at The Underground Music Awards in NYC. Concept was also the host of the Nationwide hip hop mixshow, The Mix Chronicles, on Sirius Satellite Radio. His debut album, Heavy Smoke, was released in May 2010. The entire album is produced by Concept. After Heavy Smoke, he released a few EPs with different MCs as well as a number of conceptual beat tapes, including one made completely on one flight from JFK to LAX. Concept is also one half of the NY rap duo Dirt Disciples with Rome Clientel

Discography
ALBUMS/RELEASES:

2021 - Audio Cinematography (Various Artists)
2020 - Twas The Night (Deluxe Version)
2020 - This Glorious Nightmare (Instrumentals)
2020 - 24 FPS 003: Beautiful (Instrumentals)
2020 - Stash (Tape 1) (Instrumentals)
2020 - Crime Laboratory 1 (2/ J. Depina)
2019 - 24 FPS 002: On My Mind (Instrumentals)
2019 - Prolific (Instrumentals)
2019 - Prolific
2019 - 24 FPS 001: Love Your Life (Instrumentals)
2018 - Meditations 3 (Instrumentals)
2018 - Songs From The Catalog, Vol. 2
2018 - Good Friday (w/ John Jigg$)
2018 - Meditations 2 (Instrumentals)
2018 - Songs From The Catalog, Vol. 1
2018 - Stand For Something (Dirt Disciples Album)
2018 - Seventy Nine (Instrumentals) (w/ Planet Asia)
2018 - Meditations (Instrumentals)
2018 - Young Baby Father (Instrumentals)
2016 - Flight Patterns 2 (Beat Tape)
2016 - Seventy Nine (w/ Planet Asia)
2015 - Twas The Night (Beat Tape)
2015 - The Ambition EP (Dirt Disciples)
2014 - Rome Clientel X DJ Concept Are Dirt Disciples (Bonus Edition)
2014 - Rome Clientel X DJ Concept Are Dirt Disciples (Hand Stamped - Limited Edition CD)
2013 - Young Baby father EP w/ Peter Leo
2012 - Sonidos Para Tu Alma (Beat Tape)
2012 - This Glorious Nightmare w/ The Nezitiq Mute
2012 - Heavy Smoke (Deluxe Version)
2012 - Flight Patterns (Beat Tape)
2011 - M99: Dexter Beat Tape 
2011 - Heavy Smoke
2010 - The BYOB LP (With DJ Mickey Knox)
2010 - The BYOB EP (With DJ Mickey Knox)
Crisis Center - Version 2.0 (12")
Crisis Center - Volume 1 (12")

Production Credits
2018 - Keith Murray & Canibus - "No Brainer (DJ Concept Remix)"
2018 - DJ Mickey Knox f. Tha God Fahim - "Up In Space"
2018 - PR Dean f. 38 Spesh, Profit & Rome Streets - "Blacktop Spitters"
2018 - Blu / Med / Oh No - "The Turn Up Remix"
2017 - Nature - "Throw It Up Remix"
2017 - Dirt Disciples f. Dominique Larue & Ice Grill - "Know What It Seems Like"
2017 - Mike Delorean f. Ali Vegas - "Mac In The Engine"
2017 - Typ iLL - "Another Day Another Dollar" (Off 30 Days)
2017 - GH - "Eyes So Low Remix f. Easy Money" (Off Don't Come Down That One Way)
2017 - GH - "Dirty Pianos" (Off Don't Come Down That One Way)
2017 - GH - "City Of Champions" (Off Don't Come Down That One Way)
2016 - Dirt Disciples - "Hologram" (Off Opportunity Knox Vol. 3)
2016 - DJ Concept - "Flight Patterns 2 Beat Tape" [Entirely Produced By DJ Concept]
2016 - Planet Asia & DJ Concept - "Seventy Nine" [Entirely Produced By DJ Concept]
2015 - DJ Concept - "Twas The Night Beat Tape" [Entirely Produced By DJ Concept]
2015 - Ghetto f. Smoke DZA & REKS - "Ain't Even Illegal (DJ Concept Remix)"
2015 - Dirt Disciples - The Ambition EP
2015 - Ruc Da Jackel - "World Of Lies" (Off Henny & Coke EP)
2015 - John Jigg$ - "Blown Away" (Off 51631 EP)
2015 - Bridgette Angelique - "Come On Home" (Off Heart Of A Champion EP)
2014 - Dirt Disciples - "Heartless"
2014 - Rome Clientel X DJ Concept Are Dirt Disciples
2014 - Nutso & Blaq Poet - "Let The Guns Blow Remix" (Off Opportunity Knox Vol. 2)
2014 - The Day Laborers & Eternia - "Long Day's Night" (Off Opportunity Knox Vol. 2)
2014 - Kaleber, Stat Quo & Jon Connor - "Hip Hop Remix" (Off Opportunity Knox Vol. 2)
2014 - Nature - "Timberland Season Outro" (Off Seasons Changed: Winter EP)
2014 - Nature - "Cold America Intro" (Off Seasons Changed: Winter EP)
2014 - Rome Clientel f. Chaundon - "Love Is Love" (Off Stars Earn Stripes)
2013 - Nature f. Fred The Godson - "Big Blunts" (Off Seasons Changed: Fall EP)
2013 - Typ iLL - "Godly Bounce" (Off Basic Training EP)
2013 - Rome Clientel f. Realm Reality & Skyzoo - "Champions" (Off The Empire 3: The Coronation)
2013 - Peter Leo X DJ Concept - "Young Baby Father" [Entirely Produced By DJ Concept]
2013 - Nature f. Cormega & Tommy 2 Face - "Summer Breeze" (Off Seasons Changed: Summer EP)
2013 - Nature f. DOE - "Never Falling Off" (Off Seasons Changed: Spring EP)
2013 - Ghetto - "F*ck Wit U" (Off Chain Smoking)
2013 - The Day Laborers f. Homeboy Sandman & P.So - "Pretzel Chips [DJ Concept Remix]" (Off The Album The Pretzel Chips EP)
2012 - DJ Concept f. Tools & Famoso - "Industry Morgues"
2012 - DJ Mickey Knox f. Thad Reid, Jon Hope, 6th Sense - "Fatal Attraction Remix" (Off The Album All For The Love)
2012 - Nutso f. Starvin, AG Da Coroner, Shaz IllYork, Blacastan, Spit Gemz - "Verbal Flood" (Off The Album Behind These Bars)
2012 - Peter Leo, The Kid Daytona, Little Vic, AC - "Next Thrill" (Off The Album Opportunity Knox Vol. 1)
2012 - DJ Concept - "Sonidos Para Tu Alma" [Entirely Produced By DJ Concept]
2012 - DJ Concept - "Heavy Smoke [Deluxe Version]" [Entirely Produced By DJ Concept]
2012 - DJ Concept - "Flight Patterns Beat Tape" [Entirely Produced By DJ Concept]
2012 - Typ iLL - "Intro To Concept" & "Reincarnated" (Off The Album Now Or Never)
2011 - Wais P - "So Bad"
2011 - DJ Concept - "M99: Dexter Beat Tape [Entirely Produced By DJ Concept]" 
2011 - DJ Concept f. Shabaam Sahdeeq, El Gant, FaMo$o, Nutso, FT, Bekay, Dov, Flo, 151 Proof & Climax - "Southpaw Cypher"
2011 - The Day Laborers f. Bridgette Angelique - "Journey To The Sky (Off The Blast Off EP)"
2011 - Various Artists - "Heavy Smoke [Entirely Produced By DJ Concept]"
2011 - AC - "Charlie Sheen [The Tiger Blood Remix]"
2010 - Kaleber - "Sundown [DJ Concept Remix]" (Off The BYOB LP)
2009 - Famoso - "At Odds"
2007 - Kaleber - "Hood Stripes Pt. 2" (Off the album The Anomaly)

Mixtapes
All of his promo mixtapes are available free to download

2017 - DJ Concept - RIP Prodigy (A Live Mix Of Dusty Infamous Originals)
2012 - DJ Concept / Famoso - Before The Dope Comes
2012 - DJ Concept - The J57 Collection
2011 - DJ Concept - Back2Kris
2010 - DJ Concept & DJ Mickey Knox - Kaleber Origins: A History Of Rhymin' Pt. 2
2010 - DJ Concept & DJ Dutchmaster - BallerStatus Presents: Kevin Nottingham's A3C Showcase Mixtape
2010 - DJ Concept - Lefty & Tab One: Monsters Ink
2010 - DJ Concept - Mic Fiends Tour Mixtape (For The Reef The Lost Cauze & Lefty West Coast Tour)
2010 - DJ Concept & DJ Dutchmaster - North By Northeast: NXNE (The Southwest Invasion)
2010 - DJ Concept - Theodore - A Live Tribute Set
2009 - Lefty & DJ Concept: Gangland Vol. 4 (American Nightmare)
2009 - DJ Concept - The Chemical Formula (Hosted By: The Alchemist)
2009 - DJ Concept - [PRIMO] On Fire
2009 - Chaundon & DJ Concept - Black Dynamite
2009 - Last Emperor - Science Team…Go! Mixtape / Mixed By: DJ Mickey Knox & DJ Concept
2009 - DJ Concept & Shuko - Ecko Unlimited Edition - Vol. 3 - Hosted By: Buckshot
2009 - DJ Concept - Tore Down: A Tribute To St. Ides & Many Other Fine Beverages
2009 - DJ Concept - Armed & Dangerous: Selected Cuts From Torae & Marco Polo
2009 - DJ Concept - Soundset 09′: The Mixtape
2009 - DJ Concept & Shuko: Ecko Unlimited Edition - Vol. 2 - Hosted By: Rapper Big Pooh
2009 - illroots + the bash brothers present: DJ CONCEPT - ILLUMINATI
2009 - DJ Concept & Lefty present: Gangland 3 (The Young Misguided)
2009 - DJ Concept - In Your System (R.I.P. Dilla)
2009 - Pennant Race Presents: DJ Concept - The Courtside Coast To Coast Mixtape
2009 - DJ.Concept & Shuko - Ecko Unlimited Edition - Volume 1 - Hosted By: Stat Quo (Germany Edition)
2009 - DJ Concept & Shuko - Ecko Unlimited Edition - Vol. 1 (Denmark Edition) - Hosted By: Stat Quo
2009 - DJ Concept & Shuko - Ecko Unlimited Edition - Vol. 1 (Holland Edition) - Hosted By: Stat Quo
2009 - DJ Concept - Three Kings - Hosted By: Skyzoo, Chaundon & Torae
2009 - DJ Concept - ONE [Good Thing About Music] : A Bob Marley Celebration
2009 - DJ Mickey Knox & DJ Concept Present: Undefined: The Manual Labor Sessions
2009 - DJ Concept - The Beautiful Fascination With 45's - Stack Number 1
2008 - DJ Concept - 2120 S. Michigan Avenue: Legendary Blues Music
2008 - DJ.Concept - Jimi Hendrix: A Tribute To Experience
2008 - DJ.Concept - Change Is Now Mixtape
2008 - Underground Instrumentals Vol. 2 - DJ Concept & DJ Mickey Knox
2008 - Tools - Precious Metals - Mixed By DJ Concept
2008 - DJ Concept - Music Is Life, Pt. 1
2008 - DJ Concept - Music Is Life, Pt. 2
2008 - DJ Concept & DJ Mickey Knox - The Mix Chronicles Freestyle Sessions, Vol. 1
2008 - DJ Concept - It's Grover - Live On W.E.X.E
2008 - DJ Concept - Live & Direct, Episode 4 on W.E.X.E.
2008 - DJ Concept - Live & Direct, Episode 3 on W.E.X.E.
2008 - DJ Concept - Live & Direct, Episode 2 on W.E.X.E.
2008 - DJ Concept - Live & Direct, Episode 1 on W.E.X.E.
2007 - DJ Concept - The Immortal J-Dilla (Live Set)
2006 - DJ Concept - The Wax 42 Mixtape - R.I.P.
2006 - DJ Concept - Smoke Out Session
2004 - Crisis Center Presents: HARVARD BLUE - Fuck Your Favorite Rapper
2004 - DJ Concept & Shuko - Street Hustle Volume 1 ( Hosted By: A-Mafia of Dispet)
2003 - DJ Concept - Queensbridge General - The Best Of Nas
2003 - DJ Concept - Hot Winter Hosted By Capone
2003 - DJ Concept - The Connex List Mixtape
2002 - DJ Concept - Rawkus Treats
2002 - DJ Concept - The Takeover Mixtape
2001 - DJ Concept - The Focus Mixtape
2001 - DJ Concept - Heavy Rotation 1
2001 - DJ Concept - The Best Of Cage & Necro
2001 - DJ Concept - More Than A Woman: The Best Of Aaliyah
2001 - DJ Concept - Up In Smoke
1999 - DJ Concept - Vintage Special Sauce
1999 - DJ Concept - Special Sauce Radio - Volume 1
1999 - DJ Concept - Special Sauce Radio - Volume 2
1999 - DJ Concept - Special Sauce Radio - Volume 3

THE EXECUTE PODCAST - 2008–Present

The Lost Chronicles - Show 9
The Lost Chronicles - Show 8
The Lost Chronicles - Show 7
The Lost Chronicles - Show 6
The Lost Chronicles - Show 5
The Lost Chronicles - Show 4
The Lost Chronicles - Show 3
The Lost Chronicles - Show 2
The Lost Chronicles - Show 1
The Bash Brothers Unite - New York To The Bay
Spit.Fire, Part 1
Spit.Fire, Part 2
Spit.Fire, Part 3
DJ Concept & DJ Mickey Knox - A History Of Rhymin' (The Best Of Kaleber)
Fat Beats Jump Off, Mix 001
From The Collection, Episode 3
Best Of: Hi-Tek Edition (Hosted By Hi-Tek)
New Wax, Episode 3
From The Collection, Episode 2

Affiliations and groups
The Bash Brothers (DJ Crew)
Crisis Center (with Undefined)
Dirt Disciples (with Rome Clientel)

Notes

External links
 The BYOB EP Review 
DJ Concept Official Website

Living people
American DJs
People from Long Island
Year of birth missing (living people)